Cobelodus is an extinct genus of holocephalid known from the late Carboniferous to the early Permian period. The type specimen, assigned to the genus Styptobasis, was discovered by Edward Drinker Cope in Illinois Basin black coal shales. Rainer Zangerl reassigned S. aculeata in 1973 to the genus Cobelodus, translating to 'needle tooth'. Cope's description was based from a tooth fragment and was compared to the genus Monocladodus. Cobelodus differs from Styptobasis and Monocladodus in the anatomy of its teeth and pectoral fins.

Although it was related to the chimaera, Cobelodus had a number of differences from modern forms. It had a bulbous head, large eyes, a high-arched back, and a dorsal fin placed far to the rear, above the pelvic fins. Their purpose is unknown. Type species, C. aculeatus is known from shoreline lagoon.

References

Permian fish of North America
Symmoriiformes